Hippotion scrofa is a moth of the family Sphingidae.

Distribution 
It is found in Australia, New Caledonia and Vanuatu.

Description 
The wingspan is about 70 mm. It is similar to Hippotion brennus and Hippotion joiceyi but distinguishable from the former by the lack of paired subdorsal white spots on the abdomen and from the latter by the lack of a dorsal white median line on the thorax.

Biology 
Larvae feed on Epilobium, Coprosma repens, Ipomoea and Fuchsia.

References

External links 
 Hippotion scrofa

Hippotion
Moths of Australia
Moths described in 1832